Blue Pullman is a 1960 short documentary film directed by James Ritchie, which follows the development, preparation and a journey from Manchester to London on new British Railways Blue Pullman units.

As with earlier British Transport Films, many of the personnel, scientists, engineers, crew and passengers were featured in the 20 minute film. It won several awards, including the Technical & Industrial Information section of the Festival for Films for Television in 1961. The film is also particularly noted for its score, by Clifton Parker, which, unlike the earlier Elizabethan Express is uninterrupted by any commentary.

References

External links
 Blue Pullman on the BTF site
 

1960s short documentary films
1960 films
British Transport Films
British short documentary films
1960 documentary films
Films scored by Clifton Parker
1960s British films